The 1987 Player's International Canadian Open was a tennis tournament played on outdoor hard courts. The men's tournament was held at the du Maurier Stadium in Montreal, Quebec, in Canada and was part of the 1987 Nabisco Grand Prix while the women's tournament was held at the National Tennis Centre in Toronto, Ontario, and was part of the 1987 Virginia Slims World Championship Series. The men's tournament was held from August 10 through August 16, 1987, while the women's tournament was held from August 17 through August 23, 1987.

Finals

Men's singles

 Ivan Lendl defeated  Stefan Edberg 6–4, 7–6
 It was Lendl's 5th title of the year and the 72nd of his career.

Women's singles
 Pam Shriver defeated  Zina Garrison 6–4, 6–1
 It was Shriver's 9th title of the year and the 99th of her career.

Men's doubles
 Pat Cash /  Stefan Edberg defeated  Peter Doohan /  Laurie Warder 6–7, 6–3, 6–4
 It was Cash's 3rd title of the year and the 13th of his career. It was Edberg's 7th title of the year and the 25th of his career.

Women's doubles
 Zina Garrison /  Lori McNeil defeated  Claudia Kohde-Kilsch /  Helena Suková 6–1, 6–2
 It was Garrison's 3rd title of the year and the 9th of her career. It was McNeil's 3rd title of the year and the 9th of her career.

References

External links
 
 Association of Tennis Professionals (ATP) tournament profile
 Women's Tennis Association (WTA) tournament profile

Player's Canadian Open
Player's Canadian Open
Player's Canadian Open
Canadian Open (tennis)